Max Hopp (born 20 August 1996) is a German professional darts player who competes in Professional Darts Corporation (PDC) events.

Career
Hopp reached the final of the 2011 WDF World Cup boys' singles, and won the boys' singles event at the 2012 WDF Europe Youth Cup. He also reached the last 16 of the 2012 Dutch Darts Masters, defeating Terry Jenkins and Steve Beaton before losing to Paul Nicholson.

Hopp qualified for the 2013 PDC World Darts Championship by winning the Central European Qualifier in Bielefeld and in doing so became the second-youngest player ever to compete at the championships after Mitchell Clegg. Hopp played Charl Pietersen of South Africa in the preliminary round winning by 4 legs to 1 to set up a first round match against Denis Ovens. Hopp took the first and third sets to lead the match 2–1, but then lost six legs in a row to bow out of the tournament with a 2–3 defeat.

Hopp entered Q School in an attempt to win a PDC Tour Card to play the full circuit in 2013, but could not get past the last 64 in any of the four days. He qualified for the second European Tour event of the year, the European Darts Trophy and beat Dragutin Horvat 6–1 in the first round, before losing 3–6 to Dean Winstanley. Hopp also qualified for the European Darts Open and the Austrian Darts Open, but lost in the first round in both. These results helped him to qualify for the European Championship for the first time through the European Order of Merit. He faced Paul Nicholson in the first round and led 3–1, but would lose 4–6. Hopp beat Mark Walsh 6–4 in the opening round of the German Darts Championship and was then defeated 6–3 by Jamie Caven. Hopp lost in the semi-finals of the German World Championship Qualify to Andree Welge, but reached the tournament anyway due to finishing the year eighth on the European Order of Merit which saw him claim the first of four spots available to non-qualified players. Hopp played ninth seed Robert Thornton in the first round and won the first set, before going on to be defeated 3–1.

Hopp began 2014 ranked world number 76, outside of the top 64 who guarantee themselves entry into every event for the year ahead. He entered Q School in an attempt to win a two-year tour card but was not successful and only had PDPA Associate Member status for 2014 which gave him entry to UK Open and European Tour qualifiers as well as the Challenge Tour. He qualified for six of the eight European Tour events losing in the first round in five of them, with the exception coming at the European Darts Grand Prix by eliminating Mike de Decker, but then lost 6–1 to Dave Chisnall. He also lost two finals on the Youth Tour and the final of the 10th Challenge Tour event 5–4 to Jay Foreman.

2015
In the German Qualifier for the 2015 World Championship, Hopp beat Sascha Stein 10–8 in the final but subsequently qualified through the Pro Tour Order of Merit to begin the tournament in the first round, instead of the preliminary round. He produced a superb performance against Mervyn King to beat him 3–2, sealing his place in the second round with a 161 finish. Hopp hit 10 180s during the match, the most of all the first round players in the event. He was comfortably defeated 4–0 by Vincent van der Voort in the second round. However, his play during 2014 and at the World Championship saw him rise 14 places in the rankings during the year to start 2015 62nd, the first time Hopp has been inside the top 64 who gain their PDC tour cards. At the first UK Open Qualifier he eliminated Kevin Painter, Ian White and Michael Smith to play in his first quarter-final in the PDC, where Brendan Dolan beat Hopp 6–5. This result helped him enter the UK Open at the third round stage where Kim Huybrechts beat him 9–7 after Hopp had been 7–5 up. Hopp played in his first World Cup of Darts this year. He partnered Jyhan Artut and they saw off India and Austria to make the quarter-finals, where they lost both their singles matches against England to exit the tournament. He was invited to play in the inaugural World Series of Darts Finals and saw off Dimitri Van den Bergh 6–3, before losing by a reversal of this scoreline to Peter Wright in the second round. In the final of the 2015 World Youth Championship, Hopp was never ahead of his opponent Nathan Aspinall until the final leg when he sealed the title with a 6–5 win.

2016
Hopp lost 3–1 to Benito van de Pas in the first round of the 2016 World Championship. He couldn't qualify for the UK Open, but at the fourth Players Championship he reached his first quarter-final in a year by seeing off Mensur Suljović 6–2. Hopp then lost by a reversal of this scoreline to Gerwyn Price. He claimed the fifth Development Tour title with a 4–2 victory over Steve Lennon. At the European Darts Matchplay, Hopp beat Joe Murnan 6–5, Ian White 6–2 and Terry Jenkins 6–3 to progress through to his first European Tour quarter-final, where he was defeated 6–4 by Peter Wright. He got to the second round of the European Championship by eliminating Benito van de Pas 6–4, but was heavily defeated 10–3 by James Wade. His World Youth title qualified Hopp for his first Grand Slam of Darts where he was beaten 5–4 by Brendan Dolan and defeated Martin Adams 5–2, but a 5–1 loss to Michael van Gerwen would see him finish third in Group A and exit the tournament.

2017
After eliminating Vincent van der Voort 3–1 at the 2017 World Championship, Hopp lost 4–0 to Kim Huybrechts in the second round. He teamed up with Martin Schindler at the World Cup and they played the Netherlands in the quarter-finals after overcoming Northern Ireland and Brazil. The match went to a doubles game after Schindler lost to Michael van Gerwen and Hopp beat Raymond van Barneveld 4–3 and Germany lost 4–1. He was also given an invite to play in the 2017 US Darts Masters, but was knocked out in the first round by Canada's Dave Richardson 6–3. He also qualified for the 2017 German Darts Masters, but was again knocked out 6–3 in the first round, this time by Gary Anderson.

2018
After failing to qualify for the 2018 World Championship, Hopp had a steady start to 2018, he failed to win enough money to qualify for the 2018 UK Open, but he then threw up a good string of results, which saw him reach the quarter-finals of the 2018 German Darts Grand Prix and Players Championship 7, before his and Germany's biggest moment in darts history.

After qualifying as one of 4 Host Nation qualifiers for the 2018 German Darts Open, Hopp dispatched Austria's Zoran Lerchbacher 6–1 in round 1, before defeating the defending champion and No.2 seed Peter Wright in the second round 6–4. Further 6–4 wins against Benito van de Pas and Joe Cullen came in the last 16 and last 8, which made Hopp the first German to qualify for a PDC European Tour semi-final. He then defeated the world champion Rob Cross in a last leg decider in the semi-finals. After missing 4 match darts to win 7–5, Hopp took out 121 on the bullseye to set up a final with Michael Smith, another World Youth Champion like himself. After being behind for most of the match, Hopp won in a last leg decider, and as with the semi-final against Cross, he took out 121 on the bullseye to win the title.

2019

Following Gary Anderson's withdrawal from the 2019 Premier League, Hopp was selected as one of nine 'contenders' to replace him. He would play a one-off match against Raymond van Barneveld on night seven in Berlin.

World Championship results

PDC

 2013: First round (lost to Denis Ovens 2–3)
 2014: First round (lost to Robert Thornton 1–3)
 2015: Second round (lost to Vincent van der Voort 0–4)
 2016: First round (lost to Benito van de Pas 1–3)
 2017: Second round (lost to Kim Huybrechts 0–4)
 2019: Third round (lost to Michael van Gerwen 1–4)
 2020: Third round (lost to Darius Labanauskas 2–4)
 2021: Second round (lost to Mervyn King 1–3)

Career finals

PDC European tour finals: (1 title)

Performance timeline

References

External links

1996 births
Living people
German darts players
Professional Darts Corporation former tour card holders
People from Rheingau-Taunus-Kreis
Sportspeople from Darmstadt (region)
PDC ranking title winners
PDC world youth champions
PDC World Cup of Darts German team